Ninth Avenue also known as Agha Shahi Avenue, named after Pakistani statesman Agha Shahi, is a partially signal free road located in Islamabad. It was inaugurated by the then CDA chairman Kamran Lashari on 25 February 2008.

It starts from the intersection on Khayaban-e-Iqbal (Margalla Road) near Fatima Jinnah Park and ends at the intersection on IJP Road connecting Rawalpindi and Islamabad. It is stretched between sectors F-8, G-8, H-8, I-8 and F-9, G-9, H-9, I-9. Ninth Avenue was built at a cost of PKR 1,686.373 million.

See also 
 Islamabad Highway
 Jinnah Avenue
 Kashmir Highway
 Seventh Avenue (Islamabad)

References

External links 
 Capital Development Authority
 Islamabad Administration

Islamabad
Roads in Islamabad
Roads in Islamabad Capital Territory